Whitchurch Circuit was a motor racing circuit located at the former Bristol (Whitchurch) Airport in Bristol, England. 

The Bristol & Wessex Aeroplane Club first flew from this airfield in 1930. During World War II it was used by the Air Transport Auxiliary and British Overseas Airways Corporation. It continued as Bristol's commercial airport until in 1957 this moved to Bristol Lulsgate Airport, where the Lulsgate Circuit had been. 

On 1 August 1959, the Bristol Motorcycle and Light Car Club (BM&LCC) organised the first race meeting in conjunction with the Bristol Corporation, who owned the then disused airfield at Whitchurch. The meeting consisted of six races, one of which was for Formula Two cars. However, the fastest lap of the day was set by a Formula III car in exactly 53 seconds by Jack Pitcher in a race won by Philip Robinson (Stuart-Cooper). It is probable that this is the outright all-time lap record at this track at Whitchurch as this may have been the only car meeting held here, though it is possible that another was held later in this year.

The report of the meeting in Autosport speaks of indifferent weather with only the first and last races being run on a dry track, which probably accounts for the Formula III cars being faster than the Formula 2.

Note that this fastest lap was only  slower than Jack Pitcher's outright lap, also using a Norton engine in his Cooper.

In 1937, on 22 May, the BM&LCC ran a one-off Speed Trail on the approach road to Whitchurch.

Results - main events

References

Motorsport venues in England
Defunct sports venues in Bristol